Martine Johnson, better known by her stage name Mia Martina, is a Canadian singer and songwriter. She is known for her hit singles "Stereo Love", "Burning", "Latin Moon" and "Beast". Martina has received Juno Awards nominations for "Stereo Love" and "HeartBreaker", as well as a SOCAN award in 2014 for co-writing "Burning".

Biography
Martine Johnson grew up in Saint-Ignace, New Brunswick. She speaks fluent French and English; her father has French roots. At age 18, Johnson moved to Ottawa, Ontario to study at Carleton University. During her time there, she saw an ad for an intern position at CP Music Group. After a year, Johnson went from delivering CDs to radio stations and office administration work to singing backup for other recording artists at the label.

Musical career
Johnson's first single release was a cover version of Edward Maya’s and Vika Jigulina's "Stereo Love". It reached number 10 in the Billboard Canadian Hot 100 in November 2010. To date, "Stereo Love" has reached platinum sales and earned a nomination for Dance Single of the Year at the 2011 Juno Awards. In late 2010, Don Omar collaborated with Johnson to release a remix version of "Stereo Love". The singer followed up with "Latin Moon" in May 2011, a song which reached gold sales and was re-released in French and Spanish. The single also saw a fourth release featuring Massari. The original version was nominated in the Dance/Urban/Rhythmic category at the 2012 Canadian Radio Music Awards.

Johnson's debut album Devotion was released on August 29, 2011 and reached number 77 on the Canadian Albums Chart. The album earned nominations for Dance Recording of the Year at the 2012 Juno Awards and World Recording of the Year at the 2012 East Coast Music Awards. Two more singles were released off Devotion, "Burning", "Go Crazy" (produced by Adrian Sina of the group Akcent) and "Missing You".

Johnson made a comeback with her song "Different Kind of Love" as well as her other songs that later came in fall: "DJ Saved My Life", a remix of Mariah Carey song of the same name, and "Daydream".

Discography

Albums

Singles

References

External links
Mia Martina Official Website

Living people
Canadian dance musicians
Carleton University alumni
Musicians from New Brunswick
People from Kent County, New Brunswick
Canadian women pop singers
Canadian people of French descent
21st-century Canadian women singers
1988 births